Margaret Isobel Chilton (1875–1963), born at Clifton, Bristol, was a British stained glass artist and instructor.

Career
In the early 1900s she attended the Royal College of Art in London, where she was taught by Christopher Whall.  In about 1906 she returned to Bristol where she set up her own stained glass studio. In 1918 she moved to Glasgow to take up a post at the Abbey Studio and taught for a period at the Glasgow School of Art.

In Glasgow Chilton met Marjorie Boyce Kemp (1886–1975) who was a pupil at the Glasgow School of Art and in 1922 she set up in partnership with Kemp and opened a studio at 13a George Street in Edinburgh. After a few years they moved to 12 Queen Street. She was to spend most of her working life in Scotland. She and Kemp worked together on many occasions, always working strictly in accordance with Arts and Crafts movement principles.

She was an Associate member of the Royal College of Art and a member of the Royal West Academy in Bristol. In some instances her windows were made in collaboration with Lowndes & Drury, owned by Mary Lowndes and Alfred J. Drury.

She died on 25 June 1963.

Works in Parish Churches

This is a listing of Margaret Chilton's major works, listed where possible in date order. Where a work was done in collaboration with Marjorie Kemp this is indicated in the text.

Other work

There is a Margaret Chilton window, “The Appleton Memorial Window” entitled “Feed My Lambs” and dating to 1912 at the Ely Stained Glass Museum, Ely, Cambridgeshire. The window came from St John's Church, Clifton, Bristol and was a memorial to Jane and Louisa Appleton.  The three-light window depicts Jesus with Simon Peter and some women and children.

In St  Bride's Church in Hyndland, Glasgow there is a painting by Chilton of “The Entombment” which serves as an altar piece. It was presented to the church in 1919. This is a George Frederick Bodley designed church built in 1903-1904.  Chilton had been a member of St Bride's for several years whilst living and working in Glasgow.

Warriston Crematorium was originally East Warriston House, a two-story villa built in 1808 by banker Andrew Bonar. It was converted into a crematorium in 1929 with Sir Robert Lorimer as the architect. The building has stained glass by Margaret Chilton and Marjorie Kemp.

Gallery

External links
 - gallery of Margaret Chilton's glass from St Andrew's, Leytonstone (London), St James the Great, Silsoe (Bedford) and St Alban's, Westbury Park (Bristol).

References

1875 births
1962 deaths
British stained glass artists and manufacturers
20th-century English women artists
Alumni of the Royal College of Art
Artists from Bristol